Germán Nogueira Gómez (born October 8, 1961), is a Cuban author, composer and producer. He was born in Havana, Cuba. He has been the winner of several national and international music events. He is the author of many popular songs included in soloists’ discs launched by Cuban and international music distributors.  He is the author of the song "Quema Tu Amor" performed by the Clippers and featured in the film Old Dogs (2009).

Biography 

Nogueira wrote his first poems and songs when he was 16 years old.  He began his studies in music at this time choosing the guitar as his instrument. Being a teenager is part of the trio Ecstasy, taking part in different municipal and provincial events in Cuba interpreting his own songs.

He makes his national radio and TV debut in 1984 with his song Te pido interpreted by Pablo Rosquet.

References

1961 births
Living people
People from Havana
Cuban songwriters
Male songwriters
Cuban composers
Male composers
Cuban male musicians